Since 2002, DVDs and Blu-ray Discs of the British TV series Top Gear have been released, containing full episodes, compilations, or specially filmed material.

Many episodes are not presented as originally broadcast, and are included as either abridged 50 minute versions or "Director's Cuts" with unbroadcast deleted scenes reinstated. Changes to the soundtrack are also common when the original music is not licensed for home video. Outside of the US and UK DVD releases, a heavily-edited version of series 9 was released in Germany in 2012, and Series 6 onwards have been released for digital purchase in near-uncut versions with the exception of a few episodes.

Series 2-3, 6, 10-22 & 25-27 were released in Japan on DVD for a very brief period of time by Assist-Corp in 2019, but due to poor reliability in DVD players, the BBC would revoke their licence to produce DVDs featuring their intellectual property.

Releases

References

Home video releases
Lists of home video releases